Iligan, officially the City of Iligan (Maranao: Inged a Iligan), is a 1st class highly urbanized city in the region of Northern Mindanao, Philippines. According to the 2020 census, it has a population of 363,115 people.

It is geographically within the province of Lanao del Norte but administered independently from the province. It was once part of Central Mindanao (Region 12) until the province was moved under Northern Mindanao (Region 10) in 2001. Iligan is approximately 90 kilometers away from the capital of the province, Tubod, and approximately 800 kilometers from the capital of the Philippines, Manila.

Among the 33 highly urbanized cities of the Philippines, Iligan is the third-least dense, with a population density of 421 inhabitants per square kilometer, just behind Butuan and Puerto Princesa.

Etymology

The name Iligan is from the Higaunon (Lumad/Native of Iligan) word "Ilig" which means "to go downstream". However, some also claim that the name of Iligan was taken and inspired by the Higaunon term "iligan" or "ilijan", which means "fortress of defense", an appropriate term due to frequent attacks incurred by pirates as well as other Mindanao tribes.

History

Pre-Spanish colonial area 
Iligan had its beginnings in the village of Bayug, four kilometers north of the present Poblacion. It was the earliest pre-Spanish settlement of native sea dwellers. In the later part of the 16th century, the inhabitants were subdued by the Visayan migrants from the island-nation called the Kedatuan of Dapitan, on Panglao island.

In the accounts of Jesuit historian Francisco Combes, the Moluccan Sultan of Ternate invaded Panglao. This caused the Dapitans to flee in large numbers to a re-established Dapitan, Zamboanga del Norte.

Spanish colonial era 

In Dapitan, the surviving Datu of Panglao Pagbuaya, received Legazpi's expedition in 1565. Later, Pagbuaya's son Manook was baptized Pedro Manuel Manook. Sometime afterward in by the end of the 16th century after 1565 Manook subdued the higaunon (animist) village of Bayug and turned it into one of the earliest Christian settlements in the country. Although the settlement survived other raids from other enemies, especially Muslims from Lanao, the early settlers and converts moved their settlement from Bayug to Iligan, which the Augustinian Recollects founded in 1609, thus establishing the oldest town in northern Mindanao.

The Jesuits replaced the Recollects in 1639. Iligan was the Spaniards' base of operations in attempting to conquer and Christianize the Lake Lanao area throughout its history. A stone fort called Fort St. Francis Xavier was built in 1642 where Iliganons sought refuge during raids by bandits. But the fort sank due to floods. Another fort was built and this was named Fort Victoria or Cota de Iligan.

In 1850, because of floods, Don Remigio Cabili, then Iligan's gobernadorcillo, built another fort and moved the poblacion of the old Iligan located at the mouth of Tubod River west of the old market to its present site.

Being the oldest town in Northern Mindanao, Iligan was already a part of the once undivided Misamis Province by the year 1832. However, it did not have an independent religious administration because its diocese by then was based at Misamis, the provincial capital. It was one of the biggest municipalities of Misamis Province.

The Spaniards abandoned Iligan in 1899, paving the way for the landing of the American forces in 1900.

American era

In 1903, the Moro Province was created. Iligan, because of its Moro residents, was taken away from the Misamis Province. Then, Iligan became the capital of the Lanao District and the seat of the government where the American officials lived and held office. Later in 1907, the capital of the Lanao District has transferred to Dansalan.

In 1914, under the restructuring of Moroland after the end of the Moro Province (1903–1913), Iligan became a municipality composed of eight barrios together with the municipal district of Mandulog. After enjoying peace and prosperity for about 40 years, Iligan was invaded by Japanese forces in 1942.

The liberation of Iligan by the Philippine Commonwealth forces attacked by the Japanese held sway in the city until 1944 to 1945 when the war ended. On November 15, 1944, the city held a Commonwealth Day parade to celebrate the end of Japanese atrocities and occupation.

Cityhood

Using the same territorial definition as a municipality, Iligan became a chartered city of Lanao del Norte on June 16, 1950. It was declared a first-class city in 1969 and was reclassified as First Class City "A" on July 1, 1977, by virtue of Presidential Decree No. 465. In 1983, Iligan was again reclassified as a highly urbanized city.

Lone district
Republic Act No. 9724, an Act separating the City of Iligan from the First Legislative District of the Province of Lanao del Norte was approved by President Gloria Macapagal Arroyo on October 20, 2009.

Geography
Iligan is bounded on the north by three municipalities of Misamis Oriental (namely Lugait, Manticao and Opol), to the south by three municipalities of Lanao del Norte (Baloi, Linamon and Tagoloan) and two municipalities of Lanao del Sur (Kapai and Tagoloan II), to the north-east by the city of Cagayan de Oro, to the east by the municipality of Talakag, Bukidnon; and to the west by Iligan Bay.

To the west, Iligan Bay provides ferry and container ship transportation. East of the city, flat cultivated coastal land gives way to steep volcanic hills and mountains providing the waterfalls and cold springs for which the area is well known.

Climate

Iligan falls within the third type of climate wherein the seasons are not very pronounced. Rain is more or less evenly distributed throughout the year. Because of its tropical location, the city does not experience cold weather. Neither does it experience strong weather disturbances due to its geographical location (being outside the typhoon belt) And also because of the mountains that are surrounding the city.

Barangays

Iligan is politically subdivided into 44 barangays.

 Abuno
 Acmac-Mariano Badelles Sr.
 Bagong Silang
 Bonbonon
 Bunawan
 Buru-un
 Dalipuga
 Del Carmen
 Digkilaan
 Ditucalan
 Dulag
 Hinaplanon
 Hindang
 Kabacsanan
 Kalilangan
 Kiwalan
 Lanipao
 Luinab
 Mahayahay
 Mainit
 Mandulog
 Maria Cristina
 Pala-o
 Panoroganan
 Poblacion
 Puga-an
 Rogongon
 San Miguel
 San Roque
 Santa Elena
 Santa Filomena
 Santiago
 Santo Rosario
 Saray
 Suarez 
 Tambacan 
 Tibanga
 Tipanoy
 Tomas L. Cabili (Tominobo Proper)
 Tominobo Upper
 Tubod
 Ubaldo Laya
 Upper Hinaplanon
 Villa Verde

Demographics

Iliganons are composed of a Cebuano-speaking majority and local minorities, mainly Maranaos, and other cultural minorities and immigrants. It is not only rich in natural resources and industries but it is also the home of a mix of cultures: the Maranaos of Lanao, the Higaonon of Bukidnon, and many settlers and migrants from other parts of the country. It is known for its diverse culture.

Language
Cebuano is the most spoken language in the city, with 92.27% reporting it as their first language. Minor languages include Maranao, Hiligaynon, Ilocano, Chavacano, and Waray. The majority of the population can speak and understand Tagalog (Filipino) and English, the official languages of the country. Tagalog (Filipino) and English are taught in the city's schools.

Religion

The majority of Iligan citizens are Christians (mainly Roman Catholics). The city is also the center of the Roman Catholic Diocese of Iligan which has 25 parishes in Iligan City and twelve municipalities of Lanao del Norte (Linamon, Kauswagan, Bacolod, Maigo, Kolambugan, Tubod, Baroy, Lala, Kapatagan, Sapad, Salvador, and Magsaysay). It covers an area of 3,092 square kilometers with a population of 1,551,000, which 65.5% of the population are Roman Catholics.

Muslims are the largest minority, comprising 11.48% of the population. They are mainly Sunnites.

Economy

Industrial
Iligan is known as the Industrial Center of the South as its economy is largely based on heavy industries. It produces hydroelectric power for the Mindanao region through the National Power Corporation (NAPOCOR), the site of the Mindanao Regional Center (MRC) housing Agus V, VI, and VII hydroelectric plants. Moreover, Holcim Philippines' largest Mindanao cement plant is located in the city. It also houses industries like steel, tinplate, cement, and flour mills.

After the construction of Maria Cristina (Agus VI) Hydroelectric Plant by National Power Corporation (NPC, NAPOCOR) in 1950, the city experienced rapid industrialization and continued until the late 1980s. The largest steel plant in the country, National Steel Corporation (NSC), was also established in 1962.

During the 1997 Asian financial crisis, the city experienced a severe economic slowdown. A number of industrial plants were closed, notably the National Steel Corporation.

The city saw its economic revival with the reopening of the National Steel Corporation, renamed Global Steelworks Infrastructures, Inc. (GSII) in 2004. In October 2005, GSII officially took a new corporate name: Global Steel Philippines (SPV-AMC), Inc.

Agro-Industry

Aside from heavy industries, Iligan is also a major exporter and producer of various plants and crops.

Crops:
Banana Plantations: 12,780.40 hectares
Coconut Plantations: 11,036.95 hectares
Corn Plantations: 4,193.86 hectares
Coffee Production: 969.43 hectares
Livestock: 28,992 heads
Poultry: 17,728 heads

Finance
As of the fiscal year 2018, Iligan has a current operating income of ₱2,052.89 million. The income grew by 8% compared to the fiscal year of 2017 in which Iligan's operating income was ₱1,900 million. According to the 2017 Financial Report by the Commission on Audit, Iligan's total assets amounted to ₱10.27 billion.

Cagayan de Oro-Iligan Corridor
Iligan along with its neighboring city, Cagayan de Oro, are the two major components for the Cagayan de Oro-Iligan Corridor, the fastest developing area in Northern Mindanao.

Culture

Diyandi Festival and Street Dancing is Iligan's month-long cultural celebration held every month of September and concludes on the feast day of Saint Michael the Archangel on September 29. The highlight of the event is Kasadya Street Dancing, a Comedia or ritual dance offered to the patron saint as thanksgiving.

The Kasadya Merry Making and Street Dancing has been renamed Sayaw Saulog in 2014.

Michael, the Archangel is widely regarded as the patron saint of the beloved city. The city fiesta in devotion to him is considered one of the Largest Religious Fiesta All over Mindanao and rising being ranked as one of the Pilgrim Festivals in the Major Islands of the country such as Traslacion of the Black Nazarene held in Manila, Peñafracia Festival of Bicol Region in Luzon and the Sinulog Festival in honor of Señor Sto Niño of Cebu in the Visayas. it is held every September 29 the Actual Feastday of the Archangel.

He is locally known by the Spanish version of his name, Señor San Miguel. Devotion to him is common to Christians in Iligan as he is mentioned in all the sacred scriptures in the Bible.

Tourism

Iligan is commonly known as the "City of Majestic Waterfalls" because of the numerous waterfalls located within its area. The many waterfalls in the area attract tourists from all over the world with their beauty and power. There are about 24 waterfalls in the city. The most well-known is the Maria Cristina Falls. It is also the primary source of electric power of the city, harnessed by the Agus VI Hydroelectric Plant.

Other waterfalls in the city are Tinago Falls, accessible through a 300-step staircase in Barangay Ditucalan. Mimbalut Falls in Barangay Buru-un, Abaga Falls in Barangay Suarez, and Dodiongan Falls in Barangay Bonbonon.

Limunsudan Falls in Barangay Rogongon about 50 kilometers from the city proper of Iligan. These are the highest waterfalls in the Philippines, at 265 m (870 feet).

Government

Iligan is a highly urbanized city and is politically independent of the province of Lanao del Norte. Registered voters of the city no longer vote for provincial candidates such as the Governor and Vice Governor, unlike its nearby towns that make up the provinces as a result of its charter as a city in the 1950s.

Iligan's seat of government, the city hall, is located at Buhanginan Hills in Barangay Pala-o. The local government structure is composed of one mayor, one vice mayor, and twelve councilors. Each official is elected publicly to a 3-year term and can be re-elected up to 3 terms in succession. The day-to-day administration of the city is handled by the city administrator.

Mayors after People Power Revolution 1986

Vice Mayors after People Power Revolution 1986

Transportation

Seaport

It serves the port users and passengers coming from the hinterlands of the provinces of Lanao del Norte, Lanao del Sur, parts of Misamis Oriental, and the Cities of Iligan and Marawi.

Passenger and cargo shipping lines operating in the Port of Iligan serve the cities of Manila, Cebu City, and Ozamiz.

There are around seven private seaports in Iligan operated by their respective heavy industry companies. These private seaports can be found in Barangays Maria Cristina, Suarez, Tomas L. Cabili, Santa Filomena, and Kiwalan.

Airports

The main airport is Laguindingan Airport, located in the municipality of Laguindingan, Misamis Oriental, which opened on June 15, 2013, the airport replaced Lumbia Airport as the main airport of Misamis Oriental and Northern Mindanao. It has daily commercial flights to and from Manila, Cebu, Davao, Zamboanga, Tagbilaran, Iloilo, Bacolod, Caticlan, Dumaguete and Clark via Philippine Airlines and Cebu Pacific.

Maria Cristina Airport (Momongan Airport), is located in Balo-i, Lanao del Norte, and was the main airport of Iligan in the late 1980s. Aerolift Philippines, a now-defunct regional airline, ceased its services when its passenger plane crashed into some structures at the end of the runway of the Manila Domestic Airport in 1990 which resulted to its bankruptcy. Thus, it ended its service to Iligan's airport at Balo-i which also resulted in the closure of the airport. Philippine Airlines served the city for many years before ending flights in 1998 due to the Asian financial crisis.

Bus terminals

There are two main bus terminals in Iligan.
 The Integrated Bus and Jeepney Terminal (IBJT), caters trips to and from Cagayan de Oro and various parts of Misamis Oriental.
 Southbound Bus and Jeepney Terminal caters trips to and from Dipolog, Pagadian, Cotabato City, Ozamiz City, Zamboanga City, and various parts of Lanao del Norte and Marawi.

Rural Transit (RTMI) and Super 5 Transport are the dominant public bus companies with daily trips from and to Iligan. Passenger vans and jeeps also service various municipalities in Lanao del Norte, Lanao del Sur, and Misamis Oriental.

City transportation
The public modes of transportation within the city are Jeepneys, Taxis, and Pedicabs. "Tartanillas" service main roads in Barangay Pala-o and Barangay Tambacan.

Education
The City of Iligan has one state university and seven private colleges specialized in Engineering and Information Technology, Health Services, Maritime Science, Business and Administration, Primary and Secondary Education, and Arts and Social Sciences.

With a total of 181 schools (106 public; 75 private; 17 madaris) including vocational and technical schools, Iligan has an average literacy rate of 94.71, one of the highest in the whole Philippines.

Mindanao State University – Iligan Institute of Technology

The Mindanao State University – Iligan Institute of Technology (Iligan Tech) is one of the few autonomous external campuses of the Mindanao State University (MSU) and "the light-bearer of the several campuses of the MSU System." It is considered one of the best universities in the Philippines with a standing of being within the top ten best universities in the country with excellence in Science and Technology, Engineering, Mathematics, Information Technology, and Natural Sciences. The institution has also produced many top-notchers and rankers in multiple board exams.

Colleges
 St. Michael's College, Iligan City, is known as the oldest school in the Lanao area, founded as a catechetical center way back in 1914 by Fr. Felix Cordova, S.J. It was formally established in 1915 as Escuela de San Miguel in honor of the patron saint, St. Michael the Archangel. Now on its active bid to become the city's first private Catholic university, Saint Michael's College of Iligan currently offers 8 disciplines: Business Administration, Accountancy, Hotel, and Restaurant Management, Engineering and Computer Studies, Nursing, Criminology, Education, Arts and Sciences and the Basic Education. It also offers the TESDA Ladderized Courses and the education-related Graduate Studies Program.
 St. Peter's College, Iligan City, is an engineering, accounting, and business administration school founded in 1952.
 Capitol College of Iligan Inc., more popularly known as Iligan Capitol College (ICC), is a private, non-sectarian, coeducational institution of learning which was established in 1963 by the late Engr. Sesenio S. Rosales and Madame Laureana San Pedro Rosales. It was registered with the Securities and Exchange Commission (SEC) on February 12, 1964. In 1997, Iligan Capitol College established Lyceum Foundation of Iligan which is to become its sister college beside Corpus Christi Parish in Tubod, Iligan City.
 Iligan Medical Center College, is a private and non-sectarian Medicine and Health Services school founded in 1975.
 Adventist Medical Center College – Iligan, formerly Mindanao Sanitarium and Hospital College, is one of the colleges of the Seventh-day Adventist Church. It is a medical school that focuses on healthcare courses like Nursing, Nutrition and Dietetics, Medical Technology, Physical Therapy, Pharmacy, and Radiology.
 The Lyceum of Iligan Foundation, focuses on maritime and engineering courses. It also offers courses on Hotel and Restaurant Management, Nursing, Business Administration, and other allied Health Services.
 Other notable colleges and technical schools are Iligan Computer Institute (ICI), Santa Monica Institute of Technology (SMIT), STI College, Picardal Institute of Technology (PISTEch), Saint Lawrence Institute of Technology, Masters Technological Institute of Mindanao, and ICTI Polytechnic College Inc. (formerly Iligan City Technical Institute (ICTI)).

Basic education
 Iligan City National High School, the largest high school campus in Iligan.
 Lanao Chung Hua School, the first and only Chinese school in Iligan which was founded on November 12, 1938.
 La Salle Academy is a Lasallian school. It is the first of the third generation of La Salle schools founded by the De La Salle Brothers in the country.
 Corpus Christi Parochial School of Iligan
 Iligan City East National High School, formerly known as Regional Science High School for Region XII but was then transferred to Cagayan de Oro and was changed into Iligan City East National High School. The School was founded in February 1986. Specializes in research, sciences, mathematics, technology education, and others.
Integrated Developmental School, founded as Iligan High School, was established in 1946. On July 12, 1968, the school was annexed to Mindanao State University – Iligan Institute of Technology under R.A. No. 5363.
Del Carmen Integrated School

Notable personalities

Tomas Cabili – Former Senator (1946-1957), former Secretary of National Defense (1945) and World War II veteran; died in a plane crash with President Ramon Magsaysay at Mount Manunggal in Balamban, Cebu
Gloria Macapagal Arroyo – 14th President of the Philippines
Cyrus Baguio – professional basketball player in the Philippine Basketball Association (2003–present)
Riego Gamalinda – professional basketball player in the Philippine Basketball Association (2010–present)
Nikki Bacolod – 1st runner-up of ABS-CBN's Search for a Star in a Million Season 1, Recording Artist of Viva Records, QTV 11's Posh main cast member
Shamcey Supsup – Miss Universe Philippines 2011, 3rd runner-up Miss Universe 2011 and current national director of Miss Universe Philippines
Kath Arado – player for the UE Lady Warriors Volleyball Team in the UAAP
Junix Inocian – international theatre, TV, and film actor and comedian, best known as "Kuya Mario" of Batibot
Jeson Patrombon – international tennis player
Sheila Surban – international singer-songwriter
Pia Wurtzbach – Miss Universe 2015; briefly resided in Iligan as a child with her maternal grandparents before moving to Cagayan de Oro

Sister cities

Local
  Cagayan de Oro, Misamis Oriental
  General Santos, South Cotabato
  Makati, Metro Manila
  Dipolog, Zamboanga del Norte
  Ozamiz, Misamis Occidental
  Butuan, Agusan del Norte
  Tagbilaran, Bohol

See also
List of cities in the Philippines
Roman Catholic Diocese of Iligan
Iligan Crusaders
Iligan Steel Mill
Mount Agad-Agad
Timoga Spring

References

External links

 
 Iligan Profile at the DTI Cities and Municipalities Competitive Index
 [ Philippine Standard Geographic Code]
Philippine Census Information
Local Governance Performance Management System 

 
Cities in Northern Mindanao
Populated places in Lanao del Norte
Highly urbanized cities in the Philippines
Port cities and towns in the Philippines
Populated places established in 1832
1832 establishments in the Philippines
Former provincial capitals of the Philippines
Spa towns in the Philippines